A basso porto  (At the Lower Harbor) is an opera in three acts by composer Niccola Spinelli. The opera uses an Italian language libretto by Eugene Checchi which is based on Goffredo Cognetti's 1889 play O voto. The opera premiered to critical success at the Cologne Opera on April 18, 1894, sung in a German translation by Ludwig Hartmann and Otto Hess. The work is widely considered Spinelli's greatest composition, and the prelude to the opera's third act has been programmed by numerous orchestras for performances in concert.

Notes from an English performance
A basso porto was first performed in England by the Carl Rosa Co., in March, 1899, at Brighton, and by the Queen's Hall Orchestra on October 11, 1900, under Mr. H. Wood.  The opera focuses on the slums of Naples, where Spinelli used mandolins and guitars in several places in his orchestral score. The mandolinists were Florimond and Cesare Costers.  The mandolins were an important part of the opera, accompanying the tenor song of the second act, and the finale of the third act. Spinelli composed an Intermezzo for mandolins and orchestra, as a prelude to the third and last act, a departure from the customary instrumentation. Philip J. Bone said that the audience reaction to the Intermezzo "was extraordinary." Bone, a music historian, added more detail about the use of mandolins by Spinelli, saying, "Spinelli makes good use of the mandolins, writing an elaborate cadenza in double stopping and rapid chromatic passages, which evidences a practical acquaintance with the instrument." He also said that the parts of the Intermezzo that were written for mandolins were the sections most striking feature of the Intermezzo, along with the melody written for cello.

Roles

References

1894 operas
Italian-language operas
Operas set in Naples
Operas
Operas based on plays